A gerotor is a positive displacement pump. The name gerotor is derived from "generated rotor". A gerotor unit consists of an inner and outer rotor. The inner rotor has n teeth, while the outer rotor has n+1 teeth; with n defined as a natural number greater than or equal to 2. The axis of the inner rotor is offset from the axis of the outer rotor and both rotors rotate on their respective axes. The geometry of the two rotors partitions the volume between them into n different dynamically-changing volumes. During the assembly's rotation cycle, each of these volumes changes continuously, so any given volume first increases, and then decreases. An increase creates a vacuum. This vacuum creates suction, and hence, this part of the cycle is where the inlet is located. As a volume decreases compression occurs. During this compression period, fluids can be pumped, or, if they are gaseous fluids, compressed.

Gerotor pumps are generally designed using a trochoidal inner rotor and an outer rotor formed by a circle with intersecting circular arcs.

A gerotor can also function as a pistonless rotary engine. High pressure gas enters the intake and pushes against the inner and outer rotors, causing both to rotate as the volume between the inner and outer rotor increases. During the compression period, the exhaust is pumped out.

History 
At the most basic level, a gerotor is essentially one that is moved via fluid power. Originally this fluid was water, today the wider use is in hydraulic devices. Myron F. Hill, who might be called the father of the Ge-rotor, in his booklet "Kinematics of Ge-rotors," lists efforts by Galloway in 1787, by Nash and Tilden in 1879, by Cooley in 1900, by Professor Lilly of Dublin University in 1915, and by Feuerheerd in 1918. These men were all working to perfect an internal gear mechanism by a one-tooth difference to provide displacement.

Myron Hill made his first efforts in 1906, then, in 1921, gave his entire time to developing the gerotor. He developed a great deal of geometric theory bearing upon these rotors, coined the word GE-ROTOR (meaning "Generated Rotor") and secured basic patents on GE-ROTOR.

Gerotors are widely used today throughout industry, and are produced in a variety of shapes and sizes by a number of different methods.

Uses 

 Oil pumps
 Fuel pumps
 High speed gas compressors
 Engines
 Hydraulic motors
 Power steering units
 Limited-slip differentials

See also 

 Gear pump
 Quasiturbine
 Wankel engine
 Conical screw compressor

References 

https://www.academia.edu/10200507/Gerotor_Modeling_with_NX3

External links 

 Cascon Inc.
 Nichols Portland LLC
 Pump School - Gerotor pump description and animation
 Step by step drawing 
 

Gas compressors
Engine technology